Eimhjellevatnet or Emhjellevatnet (also known as Storfjorden) is a lake in Hyen area of Gloppen Municipality in Vestland county, Norway. The  lake is located in the western part of the municipality near the border with Kinn Municipality. It is the second largest lake in all of Gloppen municipality (after Breimsvatn) and it has a good population of trout for fishing.

See also
List of lakes in Norway

References

Lakes of Vestland
Gloppen